The Sydney Russell School is a coeducational secondary school and sixth form located in Dagenham, London, England.

Admissions
It is near the junction of the A124 and Porters Avenue (A1153). It is around two miles north of the Ford Dagenham plant.

History

Grammar school
One of the predecessor schools, which was established in 1935, was Dagenham County High School. That school had around five hundred boys and girls. It was built on the Becontree Estate, which had twenty-seven thousand houses. From 1965 it was administered by the London Borough of Barking.

Comprehensive
In a reorganisation in 1970, the buildings of the above-mentioned predecessor school became the location for a new comprehensive school, Parsloes Manor School. South East Essex County Technical High School moved to a new site in 1962, and merged with Bifrons Secondary Modern School in 1970 to form Mayesbrook School. Mayesbrook merged with Parsloes Manor School to become The Sydney Russell School in 1990.

Name change
In a reorganisation in 1990, the above-mentioned predecessor school amalgamated with two other local schools. The name of the new school formed was The Sydney Russell School, after Sydney Russell (1906-1988) a local Methodist minister who served as chair of the governors at the former Parsloes Manor Comprehensive School.

Academy
In February 2015 the school converted to Academy status.

Academic performance
The school gets above average results at GCSE, with the second best EBacc results in Barking & Dagenham.

At A-level the school achieves the highest progress scores in the borough.

Notable former pupils

Dagenham County High School
 Prof Roy Greenslade, Professor of Journalism at City University, Editor from 1990 of the Daily Mirror; he traced 122 former school colleagues in 1976 and wrote a book entitled Goodbye to the Working Class
 Sidney Hinkes, pacifist
 Canon Eric James
 Peter Marshall CMG OBE, forensic seismologist at AWE Blacknest
 Dudley Moore CBE, pianist, organist and comedian
 Dave Munden (2 December 1943 - 2020), drummer with The Tremeloes
 Paul Speare, saxophonist for Dexys Midnight Runners
 Sir Kenneth Stowe CB CVO

Bifrons Secondary Modern School
 George Carey  PC, FRSA, former Archbishop of Canterbury

References
 The Guardian, 11 June 1976, page 7

External links
 The Sydney Russell School official website

Secondary schools in the London Borough of Barking and Dagenham
Dagenham
Educational institutions established in 1935
1935 establishments in England
Academies in the London Borough of Barking and Dagenham